Darling is a 1961 Spanish-West German comedy film directed by Rafael Gil and Hans Grimm and starring Vicente Parra, Marianne Hold and Manolo Morán.

Cast
 Vicente Parra as Miguel - Michael
 Marianne Hold as Verónica - Veronika
 Manolo Morán as Don Ricardo Gravina
 Horst Frank as Alberto - Albert
 Mercedes Vecino as Duchess
 Lina Yegros
 Rafael Bardem as Miguel's Father
 José Luis Pellicena as Carlos - Karl
 Carl Wery as Minister Mayer
 Germaine Damar as Cristina - Christine
 Alfredo Mayo as Minister
 Tomás Blanco as Minister
 Matilde Muñoz Sampedro as Dama de compañía
 Cándida Losada as Reverend Mother
 Juan Cortés
 Ramón Elías
 Beni Deus
 Barta Barri as Revolutionary Leader
 Pilar Cano
 Marita Oberman
 José Franco as Pietro
 Marisol Ayuso
 Adela Calderón
 Vicente Bañó as Revolutionary
 Ángel Álvarez
 Pilar Baiza
 Julio Infiesta
 Mayte Arroyo
 Miguel del Castillo as Police Inspector

References

Bibliography
 de España, Rafael. Directory of Spanish and Portuguese film-makers and films. Greenwood Press, 1994.

External links 

1961 films
West German films
German comedy films
1961 comedy films
Spanish comedy films
1960s Spanish-language films
Films directed by Rafael Gil
Films scored by Gregorio García Segura
1960s German films